Kulwinder Billa is an Indian singer and actor associated with Punjabi language music and films. He started his singing career with albums "Koi Khaas" and "Punjab" whereas his acting debut was in 2018 with Subedar Joginder Singh.

Singles

Albums

Filmography

References

External links
 

Living people
Punjabi music
Punjabi-language singers
Indian male singers
21st-century Indian male actors
Year of birth missing (living people)